USS S-18 (SS-123) was a first-group (S-1 or "Holland") S-class submarine of the United States Navy in commission from 1924 to 1945. She served during World War II, seeing duty primarily in the Aleutian Islands campaign.

Construction and commissioning
S-18′s keel was laid down on 15 August 1918 by the Bethlehem Shipbuilding Corporation's Fore River Shipyard in Quincy, Massachusetts. She was launched on 29 April 1920, sponsored by Miss Virginia Bell Johnson, and commissioned on 3 April 1924.

Service history

1924–1941
From 1924 to 1929, S-18 operated from New London, Connecticut, primarily off the New England coast but with annual deployments to the Caribbean Sea for winter maneuvers and Fleet Problems. Transferred to the United States Pacific Fleet in 1930, she departed New London on 24 May 1930, operated off the California coast into the fall of 1930, and arrived at Pearl Harbor, Hawaii, on 7 December 1930.

For the next 11 years, S-18 was based at Pearl Harbor. In September 1941, she returned to the United States West Coast.

World War II

December 1941–May 1942
The United States entered World War II with the Japanese attack on Pearl Harbor on 7 December 1941, and that month S-18 was ordered to the Aleutian Islands. A unit of Submarine Division 41, S-18 moved north in mid-January 1942. Until March 1942, she conducted defensive patrols out of the new and still incomplete submarine base at Dutch Harbor on Amaknak Island off Unalaska in the Aleutians. In mid-March 1942, she got underway for San Diego, California, and underwent repairs there until mid-May 1942.

Aleutian Islands campaign
With her repairs complete, S-18 departed San Diego in May 1942 to return to the Aleutians. While en route on 29 May 1942, she received orders to patrol the southern approaches to Umnak Pass in anticipation of a Japanese attack, and on 2 June 1942, she took up her patrol station. On 3 June 1942, Imperial Japanese Navy aircraft carrier planes attacked Dutch Harbor. commencing the Battle of Dutch Harbor of 3–4 June 1942 and beginning the Aleutian islands campaign. Soon afterward, Japanese troops landed troops on Kiska and Attu.

Hampered by fog, rain, and poor radio reception, and lacking radar, a fathometer, and deciphering equipment - S-18 remained on patrol through 10 June 1942. Orders for submerged daylight operations in combat areas compelled S-18 and the other submarines of the North Pacific Force to increase their submerged time to 19 hours a day, with surfaced recharging time cut to the brief five hours of the northern summer night. On 11 June 1942, she returned to Dutch Harbor.

On 13 June 1942, S-18 was underway again to patrol west and north of Attu, then north of Kiska. The weather, as on earlier patrols, was consistently bad. Habitability in the S-boats were poor. Material defects and design limitations in speed and maneuverability continued to plague her. On 29 June 1942, she sighted Japanese submarine but was unable to close. The same day, she returned to Dutch Harbor, and as at the conclusion of previous patrols, her commanding officer requested up-to-date sound and radar equipment.

From 15 July to 2 August 1942, S-18 conducted another patrol in the Kiska area, and on completion of that patrol, she was ordered back to San Diego.

In October 1942, S-18 returned to the Aleutians, and on 22 October 1942, she cleared Dutch Harbor for her next patrol, again in the Kiska area. On 3 November 1942, however, she was recalled and ordered to prepare for a longer, more distant patrol. On 12 November 1942 she put to sea, but on 15 November 1942, a crack in the starboard main engine housing forced her back to Dutch Harbor.

She arrived on 20 November 1942, and her repairs were completed by the end of the month. On 30 November 1942, S-18 resumed her patrol, moved west, and operated off Kiska, Kiskinato, Agattu, and Attu. On 22 December 1942, after 16 days in her patrol area, she lost her starboard stern plane, and depth control became erratic. On 28 December 1942, she returned to Dutch Harbor.

Repairs and refit took S-18 into 1943, and on 7 January 1943, she got underway again. During that 28-day patrol, she reconnoitered Attu and the Semichi Islands. On 4 February 1943, she was ordered back to San Diego for overhaul.

February 1943–September 1945
Upon completion of her overhaul, S-18 was assigned to training duty. For the remainder of World War II, she remained in the San Diego area, providing training services for the West Coast Sound School. Hostilities ended in mid-August 1945, and in late September 1945, she moved north to San Francisco, California, where she was decommissioned on 29 October 1945.

Decommissioning and disposal
On 13 November 1945, S-18′s name was struck from the Naval Vessel Register. On 9 November 1946, her 26-year-old hulk was sold for scrapping to the Salco Iron and Metal Company in San Francisco.

Awards
 Asiatic-Pacific Campaign Medal with one battle star

References

Ships built in Quincy, Massachusetts
United States S-class submarines
World War II submarines of the United States
1920 ships
Ships of the Aleutian Islands campaign